Melipotis brunnearis is a species of moth in the family Erebidae. It is found on Brazil (Pernambuco).

References

Moths described in 1852
Melipotis
Moths of South America
Taxa named by Achille Guenée